Abid ( ‘Ābid), also Abed, literally meaning worshipper, adorer, devout may be either a surname or given name.

In the Russian language, "" (Abid), or its form "" (Avid), is an old and uncommon male given name. Included into various, often handwritten, church calendars throughout the 17th–19th centuries, it was omitted from the official Synodal Menologium at the end of the 19th century. Its origins are either Arabic (where it means desired) or Aramaic (where it means work, labor). The diminutive of "Avid" is Avidka. The patronymics derived from "Avid" are "" (Avidovich; masculine) and "" (Avidovna; feminine).

As a surname, in the form Al-Abid and its variants, it is shared by the following people:
Ahmad Izzat Pasha al-Abid (1855–1924), Syrian counselor to Ottoman Sultan Abdulhamid II
Hawlu Pasha al-Abid (1824–1895), prominent Syrian administrator during the reign of Ottoman Sultan Abdulaziz; father of the former
Muhammad Ali Bay al-Abid (1867–1939), first president of the mandatory Syrian Republic; grandson of the former
Nawaf Al Abed (born 1990), Saudi association football player

As a surname:
Abid Ali Abid (1906–1971), Urdu and Persian critic and poet
Chaudhry Abid Sher Ali (born 1971), Pakistani politician and businessman
Fazle Hasan Abed (1936–2019), Bangladeshi/British social worker
Kalbe Abid (d. 1986, Maulana Syed Kalbe Abid Naqvi), mujtahid
Pépé Abed, (1911–2006), Lebanese adventurer, explorer, and entrepreneur
Qazi Abdul Majeed Abid (1915–1996), Pakistani politician and journalist
Laïla Abid (born 1977), Moroccan-Dutch journalist
Mohammed Abed al-Jabri (1936–2010), Moroccan critic and professor of philosophy and Islamic thought
Ramzi Abid (born 1980), Canadian professional ice hockey player
Ramzi Abed (born 1973), American film director
Zara Abid (1992–2020), Pakistani model

As a given name or colloquial name, it is shared by the following people:
Abed Azrie (born 1945), Syrian singer of Arab classical music
Abid Briki (born 1957), Tunisian trade unionist and politician
Abed Daoudieh (1920–2015), Jordanian politician
Abid Ghoffar Aboe Dja'far (born 1954), Javanese Indonesian singer-songwriter
Abid Hamid Mahmud (late 20th century), Iraqi military officer
Abid Hasan (diplomat) (bef. 1947–1984), officer of the Indian National Army
Abid Hassan Minto (born 1932), Pakistani lawyer
Abid Hussain (late 20th century), Indian economist and diplomat
Abed Khan (born 1945), Bangladeshi journalist
Abid Kovačević (born 1952), former Bosnian association football player
Abed Mahfouz  (born 1956), Lebanese fashion designer
Abid Mutlak al-Jubouri (late 20th century), Iraqi politician
Abid Nabi (born 1985), Indian first class cricketer
Abed Nadir, fictional character on the TV show Community
Abid Qaiyum Suleri (born 1969), Pakistani social policy analyst and development practitioner
Abed Rabah (born 1975), Israeli association football player
Abid Raja (born 1975), Pakistani Norwegian politician
Abid Raza (born 1981), Guantanamo Bay detainee
Abidur Reza Chowdhury (1872–1961), Bengali politician and educationist

See also
Abid Ali (disambiguation)
Abidi
Abdi
Ebed, the cognate name in Hebrew

References

Notes

Sources
Н. А. Петровский (N. A. Petrovsky). "Словарь русских личных имён" (Dictionary of Russian First Names). ООО Издательство "АСТ". Москва, 2005. 
А. В. Суперанская (A. V. Superanskaya). "Словарь русских имён" (Dictionary of Russian Names). Издательство Эксмо. Москва, 2005. 

Arabic masculine given names
Syrian families
Political families of Syria
Pakistani masculine given names
Russian masculine given names
Urdu-language surnames
Masculine given names
Bengali Muslim surnames